Gothic script and Gothic font may refer to:
 Blackletter (Gothic minuscule, 'Old English') an ornate calligraphic or typographical style originating in Western Europe
 Fraktur, a form of Blackletter
 Schwabacher, a form of Blackletter
 Gothic alphabet, the Greek-derived writing system of the Gothic language
 Sans-serif, or gothic, a typographical style without serif decorations. In typography, this is the meaning usually associated with the term 'gothic font', for example Century Gothic.
 East Asian Gothic typeface, a Chinese, Japanese or Korean typographical style without serifs or analogous decorations
 Visigothic script, a script style used by Visigoths in Iberia

See also
 Script typeface